National Refinery Limited (NRL) is a Pakistani oil refinery which is a subsidiary of UK-domiciled Attock Oil Company. It is based in Korangi Creek, Karachi, Pakistan.

It is a petroleum refinery and petrochemical complex engaged in the manufacture and sale of asphalts, BTX, fuel products and lubes for domestic consumption and export. National Refinery Limited is the second largest capacity refinery of Pakistan in terms of crude oil processing facilities and is the only lube oil refinery of Pakistan.

History
The company was incorporated in 1963 and first lube refinery was constructed in June 1966. Hydroskimming fuel refinery was commissioned in April 1977 and its capacity was increased in 1985. BTX (petrochemical) plant was constructed in April 1979 which was the first petrochemical unit of the country. Second lube refinery was constructed in February 1984. Since then various expansions of the refinery have been made. 

In 2005, Attock Group acquired majority shareholding of the company – with Pakistan Oilfields and Attock Refinery Limited both holding 25 percent shares each. Islamic Development Bank of Saudi Arabia holds 15 percent of the total shares.

Business relationships
The company's major purchases are made from Saudi Aramco, an oil company based in Saudi Arabia,  with a history of no default up to the financial year ending 30 June 2011. Crude oil is also received on a regular basis from the domestic oil companies in Pakistan. State Bank of Pakistan acts as the sovereign guarantor of payments made on time between the National Refinery Limited and the Saudi oil company Saudi Aramco. 

In 2017, the Supreme Court of Pakistan imposed fines on National Refinery Limited for missing its due payments to the crude oil supplier Saudi Aramco which then State Bank of Pakistan had to step in and make those payments in the form of foreign currency.

Business segments

Fuel segment
Fuel segment offers:
 Motor gasoline
 High speed diesel (HSD)
 Light diesel oil
 Kerosene oil
 Jet fuels
 Furnace oil
 Liquefied petroleum gas (LPG)
 Naptha for domestic consumption and export purposes

Lube segment
 Many types of lube base oils
 Asphalts
 Waxes and rubber process oil
 Specialty products - Benzene, Toluene, Xylene, Wax, Slackwax and Extract Oil

References

External links

National Refinery Limited

1963 establishments in Pakistan
Oil and gas companies of Pakistan
Oil refineries in Karachi
Manufacturing companies based in Karachi
Non-renewable resource companies established in 1963
Companies listed on the Pakistan Stock Exchange
2005 mergers and acquisitions
Mergers and acquisitions of Pakistani companies
Pakistani subsidiaries of foreign companies
Formerly government-owned companies of Pakistan